Exilisciurus is a genus of rodent in the family Sciuridae from forests in Southeast Asia. These tiny squirrels are mostly olive-brown to grey-brown, although E. whiteheadi has conspicuous ear-tufts. They are active, and feed on both plant-material and insects.

There are three species of Exilisciurus:

 Philippine pygmy squirrel, Exilisciurus concinnus
 Least (or plain) pygmy squirrel, Exilisciurus exilis
 Tufted pygmy squirrel, Exilisciurus whiteheadi

References

 
Rodent genera
Taxonomy articles created by Polbot